Cyanophycinase (cyanophycin degrading enzyme, beta-Asp-Arg hydrolysing enzyme, CGPase, CphB, CphE, cyanophycin granule polypeptidase, extracellular CGPase) is an enzyme. It catalyses the following chemical reaction

 [L-Asp(4-L-Arg)]n + H2O  [L-Asp(4-L-Arg)]n-1 + L-Asp(4-L-Arg)

The enzyme is highly specific for the branched polypeptide cyanophycin. It is similar to Dipeptidase E, another S51 family serine protease.

Structure 
The asymmetric unit of cyanophycinase consists of three identical chains, each containing 291 residues. The structure of cyanophycinase was determined from the freshwater cyanobacterium Synechocystis sp. PCC 6803 at 1.5-A resolution, which showed that the structure is dimeric.

Enzyme function 
Cyanophycinase is a carboxy terminal specific exopeptidase, meaning it catalyzes the cleavage of the carboxy terminal peptide bond of cyanophycin. It was hypothesized that cyanophycinase was a serine protease due to extreme inhibition of the enzyme when used with known serine protease inhibitors, such as DMSO. Site directed mutagenesis experiments confirmed that the enzyme is a serine protease and suggested that Ser 132 is the primary catalytic residue. Other key residues for specificity include Gln101, Asp172, Gln173, Arg178, Arg180 and Arg183 which form a conserved pocket adjacent to Ser 132. Kinetic characterization of the enzyme demonstrates that the enzyme displays Michaelis–Menten kinetics with a kcat of 16.5 s−1 and a kcat/KM of 7.5 × 106 M−1 s−1.

Connection to nitrogen storage in Cyanobacteria 
Cyanophycin is highly resistant to degradation by all conventional proteases, and the only enzyme known to be capable of hydrolyzing it is cyanophycinase. Cyanophycin is a non-ribosomally synthesized peptidyl polymer that is used for nitrogen storage by cyanobacteria and other select eubacteria. Approximately 90% of cyanobacteria are diazotrophic, meaning that they can grow without an external source of fixed nitrogen. Diazotrophic growth was severely impaired in bacteria with a mutated cyanophycinase gene, indicating that the inability to degrade cyanophycin is detrimental for the diazotrophic growth of the cyanobacterium, due to an excess of nitrogen storage.

References

External links 
 

EC 3.4.15